Hwang Ui-gyeong (born 7 May 1930) is a South Korean former boxer. He competed in the men's light welterweight event at the 1956 Summer Olympics.

References

External links
 

1930 births
Possibly living people
South Korean male boxers
Olympic boxers of South Korea
Boxers at the 1956 Summer Olympics
Place of birth missing (living people)
Light-welterweight boxers